Douglas Saxon Coombs  (23 November 1924 – 23 December 2016) was a New Zealand mineralogist and petrologist.

History and career 
Born in Dunedin in 1924 and educated at King's High School, Coombs attended the University of Otago, graduating with an MSc with first-class honours in 1948. He then studied at the University of Cambridge, where he was awarded a PhD in 1952.

First appointed an assistant lecturer in geology at Otago in 1947, Coombs became a professor in 1956. He retired in 1989 and was granted the title of professor emeritus.

Coombs was noted for his studies of the rocks of the southern South Island of New Zealand. The mineral species coombsite, K(Mn2+, Fe2+, Mg)13(Si, Al)18O42(OH)14, is named for him.

He was elected a Fellow of the Royal Society of New Zealand in 1962, and in 1969 he won the society's Hector Medal, at that time New Zealand's highest science prize. He received the Mineralogical Society of America Award in 1963. In the 2002 New Year Honours, Coombs was appointed a Companion of the New Zealand Order of Merit for services to mineralogy.

A right-hand batsman and leg-break bowler, Coombs played cricket for Otago in the 1942–43 season.

Coombs died in Dunedin on 23 December 2016.

See also
 List of Otago representative cricketers

References

External links
 Google scholar

1924 births
2016 deaths
Scientists from Dunedin
New Zealand cricketers
Otago cricketers
University of Otago alumni
Alumni of the University of Cambridge
20th-century New Zealand geologists
Academic staff of the University of Otago
Fellows of the Royal Society of New Zealand
Companions of the New Zealand Order of Merit
New Zealand mineralogists
Petrologists
Foreign associates of the National Academy of Sciences